Fort Stockton–Pecos County Airport  is two miles NW of Fort Stockton, Texas; it is owned and operated by Pecos County, Texas.

History
The airport opened as Gibbs Field , or Fort Stockton Field and was used by the United States Army Air Forces as a training base during World War II.

Opened on 1 June 1942 with two 2,500' turf runways. Began training United States Army Air Corps flying cadets under contract to Pacific Air School Ltd.  Assigned to United States Army Air Forces Gulf Coast Training Center (later Central Flying Training Command) as a primary (level 1) pilot training airfield. had two local auxiliary airfields for emergency and overflow landings.  Flying training was performed with Fairchild PT-19s as the primary trainer. Also had several PT-17 Stearmans and a few P-40 Warhawks assigned.

Inactivated on 12 March 1944 with the drawdown of AAFTC's pilot training program. Declared surplus and turned over to the Army Corps of Engineers on 30 September 1945. Eventually discharged to the War Assets Administration (WAA) and became a civil airport.

Airline flights (Trans-Texas DC-3s) ended in 1960.

See also

 Texas World War II Army Airfields
 31st Flying Training Wing (World War II)

References

 Manning, Thomas A. (2005), History of Air Education and Training Command, 1942–2002.  Office of History and Research, Headquarters, AETC, Randolph AFB, Texas 
 Shaw, Frederick J. (2004), Locating Air Force Base Sites, History’s Legacy, Air Force History and Museums Program, United States Air Force, Washington DC. 
 AirNav.Com – Fort Stockton–Pecos County Airport (KFST)
 Thole, Lou (1999), Forgotten Fields of America : World War II Bases and Training, Then and Now – Vol. 2.  Publisher: Pictorial Histories Pub,

External links
 
 

Airports in Texas
Buildings and structures in Pecos County, Texas
Fort Stockton, Texas
Transportation in Pecos County, Texas
Airports established in 1942
1942 establishments in Texas
Airfields of the United States Army Air Forces in Texas
USAAF Contract Flying School Airfields
Defunct airports in Texas